Ataxia canescens is a species of beetle in the family Cerambycidae. It was described by Henry Walter Bates in 1880. It is known from Honduras and Mexico.

References

Ataxia (beetle)
Beetles described in 1880